Vanessa Virgen Zepeda (born July 11, 1984, in Manzanillo, Colima) is a female beach volleyball player from Mexico, who played during the Swatch FIVB World Tour 2005 playing with Alejandra Acosta and 2006, playing with Diana Estrada.

She also represented her home country at the 2006 Central American and Caribbean Games partnering Martha Revuelta and winning the silver medal.
At the NORCECA Beach Volleyball Circuit 2008 she claimed three times the 4th place.

She claimed her first podium and the 2nd place at the 2009 NORCECA Caymand Islands Tournament playing with Paulette Cruz, whom she conquered some weeks later the 3rd place at the Boca Chica Tournament, in Dominican Republic.

Indoor
She also played indoor volleyball during the 2007 year, playing the Pan American Cup and the tournament during the Pan American Games.

References

External links
 
 

1984 births
Living people
Sportspeople from Manzanillo, Colima
Mexican beach volleyball players
Volleyball players at the 2007 Pan American Games
Women's beach volleyball players
Central American and Caribbean Games silver medalists for Mexico
Competitors at the 2006 Central American and Caribbean Games
Central American and Caribbean Games medalists in beach volleyball
Pan American Games competitors for Mexico
21st-century Mexican women
20th-century Mexican women